Mansi Sharma (born 16 March 1989) is an Indian actress and model who has appeared in Ginny Weds Sunny, Begum Jaan, Amaanat and few other Bollywood movies.

Filmography

Film
Acha Dhin as Sheetal (Malayalam)
Ginny Weds Sunny as Manpreet (Hindi)
Amaanat (2019 film) as Lover Bride (Punjabi film)
Begum Jaan as Girl in Bus (Hindi film)
Brij Mohan Amar Rahe as Customer one (film)
Halwa as Lead (Hindi Short film)

Television
2018 Manmohini as Village Girl.
2018 Mariam Khan - Reporting Live as Aayat Khan.
2019 Patiala Babes as Parlour Girl.
2019/2021–2022 Choti Sarrdaarni as Harleen Kaur Gill.
2013-14 - Mahabharat Star Plus as Ambalika.

References

External links

Living people
Indian television actresses
Indian film actresses
1992 births